Margherita di Savoia may refer to:

Places
Italy
 Margherita di Savoia, Apulia, a comune in the Province of Barletta-Andria-Trani

People
 The Blessed Margaret of Savoy (1390–1464), marchioness of Montferrat
 Margherita of Savoy (1851-1926), queen consort of King Umberto I of Italy

See also
 Margaret of Savoy (disambiguation)